Marta Milani (born 9 March 1987) is an Italian sprint athlete, who specializes in the 400 metres.

National records
 4x400 metres relay indoor: 3:31.99 ( Sopot, 8 March 2014) - with Maria Enrica Spacca, Chiara Bazzoni, Elena Maria Bonfanti

Achievements

National titles
He won 7 national championships at individual senior level.
Italian Athletics Championships
400 m: 2011
800 m: 2012, 2013, 2014
Italian Indoor Athletics Championships
400 m: 2010, 2011
800 m: 2014

See also
Italian all-time top lists - 400 metres

References

External links

1987 births
Living people
Italian female sprinters
Sportspeople from the Province of Bergamo
Athletics competitors of Gruppo Sportivo Esercito
World Athletics Championships athletes for Italy
People from Treviglio
European Games competitors for Italy
Athletes (track and field) at the 2019 European Games
20th-century Italian women
21st-century Italian women